Danubian Plain can be a translation of:

 the approximate Serbian name (Podunavska nizija - literally: Danubian Lowland) for the Serbian part of the Pannonian plain
 the Serbian (Podunavska nizija) and Hungarian (Dunamenti síkság - literally: Danubian Lowland) name for a part of the Great Alföld
 the Slovak name (Podunajská nížina -literally: Danubian Lowland) for the Slovak part of the Little Alföld, see Danubian Lowland
 the Slovak name (Podunajská rovina - literally: Danubian Flat/Plain) for a part of the Podunajská nížina, see Danubian Flat
 the Bulgarian name (Dunavska ravnina - literally: Danubian Plain) and Romanian name (Câmpia Dunării) for a group of plains and lowlands in Romania, Bulgaria, and Serbia, see Danubian Plain and Wallachian Plain